Susan Nan Woods (born June 21, 1966, in Chicago, Illinois, U.S.) is a retired American actress who began her brief career in the mid-1980s. Her best-known role was Cherry White in the first two seasons of the ABC television series China Beach.

After working for just four years and appearing in the first two seasons of China Beach, along with a couple of film roles and a couple of TV movies, Woods decided acting was not for her and retired at the age of 22.

Filmography
China Beach (TV series) (15 episodes, 1988–1989) - Cherry White
In the Mood (1987) - Madeline
The Betty Ford Story (1987) (TV movie) - Susan Ford
Lady Blue (TV series) (1 episode, "Willow", 1986) - Willow 
One More Saturday Night (1986) - Diane Lundahl
Welcome Home, Bobby (1986) (TV movie) - Beth

References

External links

American film actresses
American television actresses
Actresses from Chicago
1966 births
Living people
21st-century American women